Butte College is a public community college in the Butte-Glenn Community College District in Chico and Orland, California.

History 
After the passage of the 1960 Donahoe Act, the voters of Butte County created a local community college district in 1966 to serve the educational and vocational needs of its citizens. In 1967, Butte College began by offering law enforcement, fire science, and vocational nursing classes in various locations throughout Butte County. The college officially opened its doors to the community in 1968 at the old Durham High School site, with over 1,900 people enrolled at the new college. In 1974, the college moved from Durham to its present location near the geographic center of Butte County and, in 1975, Glenn County joined the District.

Campus 
The campus rests on a wildlife refuge, and has been recognized as a national community college leader in sustainability, winning the grand prize 2008 National Wildlife Federation's Chill Out Contest and the 2009 National Campus Sustainability Leadership Award.

Notable people

References

External links
Official website

 
California Community Colleges
Education in Chico, California
Educational institutions established in 1967
Schools accredited by the Western Association of Schools and Colleges
Two-year colleges in the United States
Universities and colleges in Butte County, California
1967 establishments in California